MHRA may refer to:

Organisations
 Medicines and Healthcare products Regulatory Agency, UK
 Michigan Hot Rod Association, US
 Modern Humanities Research Association, UK
 MHRA Style Guide, an academic style guide

Other uses
 Men's human rights activism